The 2022–23 Norfolk State Spartans men's basketball team represents Norfolk State University in the 2022–23 NCAA Division I men's basketball season. The Spartans, led by tenth-year head coach Robert Jones, play their home games at the Joseph G. Echols Memorial Hall in Norfolk, Virginia as members of the Mid-Eastern Athletic Conference.

Previous season
The Spartans finished the 2021–22 season 24–7, 12–2 in MEAC play to finish as MEAC regular season champions. In the MEAC tournament, they defeated Delaware State, Morgan State, and Coppin State to win the MEAC tournament championship and earned the conference's automatic bid to the NCAA tournament. They received the No. 16 seed in the East Region, where they would lose to the defending champions Baylor in the First Round.

Roster

Schedule and results

|-
!colspan=12 style=| Regular season

|-
!colspan=9 style=| MEAC tournament

Sources

References

Norfolk State Spartans men's basketball seasons
Norfolk State Spartans
Norfolk State Spartans men's basketball
Norfolk State Spartans men's basketball